Karlamanbash (Qarlımanbaş) is a rural locality (a village) in Starobabichevsky Selsoviet, Karmaskalinsky District, Bashkortostan, Russia. The population was 204 as of 2010. There is 1 street.

Geography 
Karlamanbash is located 15 km south of Karmaskaly (the district's administrative centre) by road. Novy Kuganak is the nearest rural locality.

References 

Rural localities in Karmaskalinsky District